Cogs, Wheels & Lovers is the twenty-first studio album by British folk rock band Steeleye Span. It was released on 26 October 2009. It is the band's fourth studio album to feature the line-up of Maddy Prior, Peter Knight, Rick Kemp, Ken Nicol and Liam Genockey.

The songs on the album are entirely traditional pieces.  As such, this album marks a return to the band's early pattern of recording modern arrangements of traditional songs, and marks a departure of its tendency, demonstrated since the early 1980s, of doing both traditional songs and songs they wrote themselves.

Cogs, Wheels and Lovers was the last album to feature guitarist Ken Nicol.

Personnel
Steeleye Span
Maddy Prior - vocals
Peter Knight - violin, vocals
Rick Kemp - bass, vocals
Ken Nicol - guitar, vocals
Liam Genockey - drums, percussion

Track listing
 "Gallant Frigate Amphitrite"
 "Locks and Bolts"
 "Creeping Jane" 
 "Just as the Tide" 
 "Ranzo" 
 "The Machiner's Song" 
 "Our Captain Cried" 
 "Two Constant Lovers" 
 "Madam will you Walk" 
 "The Unquiet Grave"
 "Thornaby Woods", followed by the 'hidden track', "The Great Silkie of Sule Skerry"

References

Steeleye Span albums
2009 albums